Huang Ziliang may refer to:

Derek Wong (born 1989), Singaporean badminton player
Ooi Tze Liang (born 1993), Malaysian diver